Kires may refer to:

 Ali Kireş (born 1991), Turkish footballer

See also

 Keres (disambiguation)
 Keris (disambiguation)
 Kiris (disambiguation)